The 2022 World Junior Ice Hockey Championship Division III was an international ice hockey tournament, the lowest tier of the IIHF World Junior Championship. The tournament would have been held in Querétaro, Mexico, from 6 to 16 January 2022, but was cancelled due to the COVID-19 pandemic. It was rescheduled and was played from 22 to 30 July 2022.

Bulgaria withdrew from the July tournament and was replaced by Australia, which originally opted out of the January tournament.

To be eligible as a junior player in this tournament, a player cannot be born earlier than 2002.

Participating teams

First round

Group A

Group B

Playoffs
All teams enter the Quarterfinals; Semifinals are to be re-seeded.

Quarterfinals

Semifinals

7th place match

5th place match

3rd place match

Final

Final standings

References

III
2021–22 in Mexican ice hockey
International ice hockey competitions hosted by Mexico
World Junior Ice Hockey Championships – Division III
Sport in Querétaro
World Junior Ice Hockey Championships – Division III